Victor Ramahatra (born 6 September 1945) is a former politician in Madagascar. He was born in Antananarivo. During the presidency of Didier Ratsiraka, Ramahatra served as Prime Minister of Madagascar from 12 February 1988 until 8 August 1991, replacing long-time prime minister Désiré Rakotoarijaona. When Ratsiraka returned to office in 1997, Ramahatra became a special military adviser to him. In June 2002 Ramahatra was charged with treason and imprisoned for alleged involvement in a plot to assassinate President Marc Ravalomanana. He was released in October 2002.

References

1945 births
Living people
Malagasy prisoners and detainees
Prisoners and detainees of Madagascar
People from Antananarivo
Prime Ministers of Madagascar